Lina Makoul (born ) is an independent Palestinian-Israeli singer-songwriter and music producer.

Biography
Makoul was born in Ohio to Arab-Christian parents and raised in the city of Acre. Since the age of four she has loved dancing, playing the piano and singing. She is fluent five languages. She has described herself as an "American-Palestinian".

She started studying biology at the Technion – Israel Institute of Technology, which she dropped in order to pursue her singing career.

Career

2012-2013: The Voice Israel 
In 2012, Makoul auditioned for the second season of The Voice Israel and in 2013 she became the first Arab to win on the show. Throughout the show she was also voted "best singer" by viewers. In an audition for the second season of the reality singing competition The Voice Israel in late 2012, On 23 March 2013, Makoul won the final at the Nokia Arena in Tel Aviv with 62% of the vote, having performed "What A Feeling", theme song of the movie Flashdance. Along with her mentor Shabat, she performed a song written and composed by him with his daughter singer Manor Shabat. She also sang Hallelujah by Leonard Cohen. She was approached by Israeli-born international manager Irit TenHengel, who signed her to her label, Yodan Productions.

2016: Opening for Queen + Adam Lambert 
In September 2016, Makoul was selected as the opening act for the band Queen + Adam Lambert in Tel Aviv.

In late 2016, her cover of Alicia Keys' "Holy War" caught Keys' attention who proceeded to share the song on her official social media channels.

2017: Touring with Little Mix 
In September 2017, she announced she would be supporting British girl group Little Mix on the UK and Ireland leg of The Glory Days Tour for all 37 arena dates from October until November 2017.

She performed an Arabic version of Silent Night for the documentary film Silent Night: A Song for the World (2020).

Discography
Her first single "This Ain't About You" was released worldwide on the April 29, 2016. The track achieved a top 10 in the UK Music-Week's Club and Pop Charts. Her second single "Dance Sucker" rose even further to No. 4 in the UK Music Week's Official Club Chart, reflecting her growing international success.

Single "Dance Sucker" was released as a preview of Makul's new album Walking on a Tightrope released in 2017. The track was produced by Grammy Award winner Jerry Wonda and Tal Forer. The album features songs written by Karen Poole (David Guetta / Janet Jackson / Kylie Minogue) and Grammy Award winner Eliot Kennedy (Spice Girls / Take That). Lina is currently working with writers such as Brit Award Nominee Maegan Cottone (Demi Lovato / Iggy Azalea / Britney / Little Mix), Hiten Bharadia (Craig David / Lemar / Omi / Tiesto) and Knightstarr (Anne-Marie / Janelle Monáe).

Singles

References

21st-century Israeli women singers
1993 births
Living people
People from Acre, Israel
The Voice (franchise) winners
Israeli Arab Christians
Israeli people of Palestinian descent
Arab citizens of Israel
American people of Israeli descent
American people of Arab descent
American people of Palestinian descent